Jair Arantes do Nascimento (22 July 1942 – 25 March 2020), known as Zoca, was a Brazilian footballer who played as a forward. He was the brother of Pelé.

Footballing career
Zoca was born in Três Corações, Minas Gerais, two years after his older brother, legendary Brazilian footballer Pelé. He grew up in the Bauru municipality in São Paulo state as a child, joining the youth academy of Noroeste in the 1950s. He moved to Santos, São Paulo, joining Portuguesa Santista, where he played briefly before following in his brother's footsteps and signing for Santos in 1960.

He made his debut for Santos on 10 April 1961, coming on as a substitute for Coutinho in a 6–1 win over America-RJ. In the last minute of the game, Santos won a penalty, and though he stepped up to take it, Zoca failed to convert from the spot. Between April and June 1962, with seven members of the Santos squad at the 1962 FIFA World Cup, Zoca was given a run in the squad for the Copa São Paulo. His first official goal for Santos came in this competition, scoring in a 2–1 loss to Corinthians de Presidente Prudente. In total, he scored four goals in fifteen games for Santos, before retiring in 1966 to focus on supporting his brother's career.

Later life and death
Zoca received degrees in marketing and law from the Catholic University of Santos and University of São Paulo, respectfully. He worked as his brother's business manager during his time with the New York Cosmos. 

In 1979, with Zoca looking to study English at the Manhattanville College in Purchase, New York, the athletic director of the college, Joe Daunic, reached out and offered him the chance to coach the college women's soccer team while he studied, in an attempt to improve his English by immersing himself. Initially reluctant, Zoca eventually agreed, going on to manage the side for three seasons. In 1982, he was the assistant of the Long Island University women's soccer team.

Zoca died on 25 March 2020, after suffering with prostate cancer.

References

1942 births
2020 deaths
University of São Paulo alumni
Manhattanville College alumni
People from Três Corações
Sportspeople from Minas Gerais
Brazilian footballers
Association football forwards
Esporte Clube Noroeste players
Associação Atlética Portuguesa (Santos) players
Santos FC players
Brazilian expatriate sportspeople in the United States